Palace Hotel (German: Palast Hotel) is a 1952 Swiss-West German drama film directed by Emil Berna and Leonard Steckel and starring Paul Hubschmid, Käthe Gold and Anne-Marie Blanc. It was made at the Bellerive Studios in Zurich. The film's sets were designed by the art director Jean d'Eaubonne.

Cast
 Paul Hubschmid as Fredy 
 Käthe Gold as Emilie, Zimmermädchen  
 Anne-Marie Blanc as Inhaberin des Hotels  
 Claude Farell as Madame Perrat  
 Liliana Tellini as Speranza, Zimmermädchen  
 Gustav Knuth as Loosli, Kellermeister  
 Emil Hegetschweiler as Staub, Zimmerkellner  
 Zarli Carigiet as Giachem, Konditor  
 Max Haufler as Hunziker, Oberheizer  
 Alfred Rasser as Leblanc, Küchenchef  
 Otto Zehnder as Walter, Emilies Sohn  
 Margrit Rainer as Hilde Staub, Telefonistin  
 Helen Vita as Fräulein Lüthi, Telefonistin  
 Walburga Gmür as Frau Muffler, Putzfrau 
 Sigfrit Steiner as Gloor, Buchhalter  
 Lys Assia as Schlager-Sängerin  
 Heinz Woester as Konsul Rainer  
 Lukas Ammann as Dr. Suvalà  
 Else Bötticher as Frau Rainer 
 Schaggi Streuli as Buol, Präsident eines Sportvereins 
 Walo Lüönd as Hotelpage

References

Bibliography 
 Hans-Michael Bock and Tim Bergfelder. The Concise Cinegraph: An Encyclopedia of German Cinema. Berghahn Books, 2009.

External links 
 

1952 films
Swiss drama films
1952 drama films
German drama films
West German films
1950s German-language films
Films directed by Leonard Steckel
Swiss black-and-white films
German black-and-white films
1950s German films